The Konka is a left tributary of the Dnieper, flowing through the Zaporizhzhia Oblast. Among cities that are located on the river are Polohy, Orikhiv and others.

The name is a local adaptation of the Crimean Tatar name of the river Yilki Su which means a water of wild horses. At the mouth of the river was located a residence of Beylerbey Mamai. In 18th century it served as a border between the Russian Empire and the Ottoman Empire.

References

External links
 Konka in the Great Soviet Encyclopedia

Rivers of Zaporizhzhia Oblast